Theridion pictum is a species of cobweb spider in the family Theridiidae. It is found in the United States, Canada, Europe, and Turkey. It is the type species of the genus Theridion.

This species creates webs on a variety of vegetation such as bushes and tall grasses and flowers as well as on man made objects such as posts and fences. It is found in low, lying damp areas and has been recorded among moss and plant litter in wetlands. The males and females become mature in the early to mid-summer and the females may persist into November.

References

External links

 

Theridiidae
Articles created by Qbugbot
Spiders described in 1802